Cinema Express was an Indian Tamil-language entertainment fortnightly magazine published from Chennai, Tamil Nadu. It was a part of The New Indian Express Group, which also publishes Samakalika Malayalam Vaarika weekly as well as Dinamani and Kannada Prabha newspapers. The Cinema Express brand is now used for the film industry coverage of The New Indian Express regardless of language.

Cinema Express also honoured artistic excellence of professionals in the Indian film industry through the Cinema Express Awards. The published version was discontinued in February 2016, in favour of an online magazine.

History
Cinema Express came out with their first issue on 10 January 1980 and had the last on 16 February 2016. The magazine was priced at Rs.15 when publication ceased. Afterwards, The New Indian Express Group used the name Cinema Express for the online magazine that publishes information related to cinema.

See also
Cinema Express Awards
Cinema Express Awards - 1988
Cinema Express Award for Best Film - Tamil
Cinema Express Award for Best Actor - Tamil
Cinema Express Award for Best Actress - Tamil

References

External links
Cinema Express Website
Epaper

1980 establishments in Tamil Nadu
2016 disestablishments in India
Defunct magazines published in India
Film magazines published in India
Biweekly magazines published in India
Magazines established in 1980
Magazines disestablished in 2016
Mass media in Chennai
Tamil-language magazines